OH 9 may refer to:

Ohio State Route 9
Ohio's 9th congressional district
Olduvai Hominid 9